Black River may refer to any of seven streams in the U.S. state of Michigan:

 Black River (Alcona County), flows into Lake Huron at the community of Black River, Michigan
 Black River (Cheboygan County), also flows through Otsego, Montmorency, and Presque Isle counties into the Straits of Mackinac at Cheboygan, Michigan
 Black River (Southwest Michigan), flows through Allegan and Van Buren counties into Lake Michigan at South Haven
 Black River (Gogebic County), a National Wild and Scenic River in the Ottawa National Forest that flows into Lake Superior
 Black River (Mackinac County), flows into Lake Michigan
 Black River (Marquette County), flows into the Middle Branch of the Escanaba River
 Black River (St. Clair River tributary), rises in Sanilac County and flows into the St. Clair River at Port Huron, Michigan
 Macatawa River (flows into Lake Macatawa) in Ottawa County is also known as the Black River

See also 
 List of Michigan rivers named Little Black River
 Black River, Michigan, a community in Alcona County
 Black River (disambiguation)

Black
Black